This is a list of 194 species in the genus Platynus.

Platynus species

References